Giambi is an Italian surname.

Geographical distribution 

As of 2014: 

 77.7% of all known bearers of the surname Giambi were residents of Italy (frequency 1:97,348);
 10.6% of the United States (1:4,200,596);
 8.4% of France (1:978,052); and 
 1.4% of Argentina (1:3,885,774).

In Italy, the frequency of the surname was higher than the national average (1:97,348) in the following regions:

 1. Umbria (1:11,802)
 2. Emilia-Romagna (1:21,451)
 3. Lazio (1:22,924)
 4. Tuscany (1:44,986)

People 

 Jason Giambi (born 1971), American professional baseball player; brother of Jeremy Giambi
 Jeremy Giambi (19742022), American professional baseball player; brother of Jason Giambi

References 

Italian-language surnames
Surnames of Italian origin